Elias Venezis (March 4, 1904 - August 3, 1973) is the pseudonym of Elias Mellos,  a major Greek novelist. He was born in 1904 in Ayvalık (Kydonies) in Asia Minor and died in Athens in  1973. He wrote many books, of which the most famous are Number 31328 and Aeolian Earth. He is considered to be one of the writers of "Generation of the '30s".

Biography 

Elias Venezis was born and raised in Aivali (the hellenized pronunciation of ), where he completed high school. During the Asia Minor Catastrophe, Venezis’ family fled from Aivali to Lesbos to avoid persecution but returned to Asia Minor after the Greek army took over Smyrna and its hinterland in 1919. When the area was recaptured by the Turkish Army, Venezis was taken prisoner and enslaved in a “labour battalion”. He was 18 years old. The prisoners were marched into the interior, but few arrived at the destination, since most of them were either killed on the way, or died of the hardships they were exposed to. Of the 3000 "conscripted" into his “labour brigade” only 23 survived.

When Venezis was released he was returned to Lesbos. There he met Stratis Myrivilis, who had founded the weekly newspaper Kambana, and was encouraged by him to write an account of "his horrific experiences as a hostage in Turkey" for the newspaper. The novel which resulted was published in serialised form in Kambana in 1924. However it did not become well known in Greece until an expanded version was published in book form in 1931.

His major novels are about his life in Asia Minor: Aeolian Land describes the lost Eden of his childhood summers; Number 31328 the horrific experience of the death marches, and Tranquility his struggle to adjust to living in Greece.

In Greece, Venezis worked for a bank while writing in his spare time. He married Stavritsa Molyviati in 1938. She too was from Aivali.

During the German occupation of Greece, Venezis was taken prisoner again. He was released following the intercession of high-ranking Greek officials including Archbishop Damaskinos.

After the war, Venezis wrote a column in the newspaper Acropolis. He was made a member of the Academy of Athens.

Books by Elias Venezis

Number 31328 (Το Νούμερο 31328, 1924; 1931)
Manolis Lekas and Other Stories (1928)
Tranquility (Γαλήνη, 1939)
Aeolian Earth (Αιολική Γη, 1943)
Block C (play, 1945)
Exodus (Έξοδος, 1950)

Books in English 

Elias Venezis by Alexander & Helen Karanikas (New York: Twayne Publishers, 1969)
Block C by Elias Venezis (Athens: I.D. Kollarou, 1946)
Aeolia by Elias Venezis, trans. E. D. Scott-Kilvert (London: William Campion, 1949; New York: Vanguard Press, 1957)
Aiolian Land by  Elias Venezis (Montréal: McGill University, 1979) in the series The McGill University Companions to Modern Greek Studies
Land of Aeolia by  Ilias Venezis - Therese Sellers (Translator) - Denise Harvey 2021

References

1904 births
1973 deaths
20th-century Greek novelists
Anatolian Greeks
Members of the Academy of Athens (modern)
Generation of the '30s
People from Lesbos
People from Ayvalık